The Dead Christ or The Redeemer in Death is a statue of Jesus Christ executed in white Carrara marble by the Irish sculptor John Hogan in Rome.

Hogan created three versions of the statue in the early 19th century:
 the first (1829) is located in St. Teresa's Church, Dublin, Ireland
 the second (1833) in St. Finbarr's (South) Church, Cork, Ireland
 the third and final (1854) is located in the Basilica of St. John the Baptist, St. John's, Newfoundland

A fourth statue is on display in the Crawford Art Gallery in Cork, Ireland. It is a plaster cast, bearing Hogan's initials.

See also
 List of statues of Jesus
 Veiled Christ

References

1829 sculptures
1833 sculptures
1854 sculptures
Statues of Jesus